City of Liverpool Football Club is an English fan-owned football club formed in 2015 and based in Liverpool, England. It is currently a member of Division One West in the Northern Premier League, which is part of the 8th tier of English football.

History

Formation and league application (2015–2016)
The first meeting that led to the formation of the club was proposed in October 2014 by Paul Manning; also present at that first meeting were Peter Furmedge, Martin Jones, Kevin Morland, and Nicky Allt. Names including "Liverpool City FC" and "Merseyside FC" were considered before the club was officially established in May 2015 as "City of Liverpool FC". The club chose to play in the colour purple due to its reputation as the "civic colour" of the city, owing to the fact that the city's two most famous football teams are Everton FC, whose colour is blue, and Liverpool FC, whose colour is red.

Due to work commitments and other issues, Allt and Morland had left the venture by December 2014, and Stuart Fitzgerald joined the remaining three committee members in February 2015. The club held an open public meeting in September 2015, by which time Jones had also left the organisation. The community voted to form the club as a community benefit society on socialist principles and the club held its first members' meeting at Jack Jones House in Liverpool city centre in February 2016.

Simon Burton, formerly of Runcorn Town, was appointed as the first manager of the club in March 2016. The club applied to join the North West Counties Football League in early 2016, but their application was rejected by the Football Association in May and they were instead placed in the Liverpool County Premier League. They chose to take up their option to appeal against the decision, particularly in light of the league being left with a vacancy following the resignation of Northwich Manchester Villa, and attended an appeal hearing at Wembley Stadium on 8 June 2016, also attended by the two remaining directors Manning and Furmedge as Fitzgerald had left the board in April 2016. The appeal was successful, allowing the club to join the First Division of the North West Counties Football League for the 2016–17 season.

Season 2016–17: Debut season, two cup wins, and play-off winners 
The club played their first game away to Prestatyn Town of the Cymru Alliance on 9 July 2016 in a pre-season friendly, which resulted in a 3–2 win. An unbeaten start throughout August in the NWCFL inaugural season bode well for the season, until a 2–1 defeat at Daisy Hill in early September. However, a 2–1 win away to Whitchurch Alport in November saw the team reach the top of the league and they remained in the promotion race until late into the season. The club missed out on automatic promotion in the end, but secured a place in the playoffs after finishing 4th. In December 2016, the club secured a 2.5-year sponsorship agreement with local social housing provider Regenda Homes.

The club reached two cup finals in their first campaign, defeating Widnes 4–0 on aggregate to reach the final of the NWCFL First Division Challenge Cup, and then overturning a two-goal deficit against Chadderton before eventually winning a penalty shoot-out to reach the final of the NWCFL League Challenge Cup. They faced Sandbach United in the First Division Challenge Cup final on 1 May 2017 in Runcorn; Jamie McDonald scored the only goal of the match, which led the club to win its first ever trophy. They defeated Whitchurch Alport 1–0 in the playoff semi-final and beat neighbours Litherland REMYCA 3–0 in the final, also facing Premier Division side Barnoldswick Town in the final of the League Challenge Cup and winning the game 3–2 on penalties, despite being reduced to 10 men and subsequently 9 men after Matthew Williams was sent off in the 1st half and Kevin McEllin was sent off in the 1st period of extra time. The match finished 1–1 aet. City of Liverpool FC became only the 2nd team in the history of the North West Counties League to win the historic Cup double after Cammell Laird did the same in season 2004–05.

At the NWCFL AGM held at the Imperial Hotel in Blackpool on 17 June 2017, Simon Burton was awarded the title of "1st Division Manager of the Year" and Stephen Longrigg was awarded the title of "1st Division Goalkeeper of the Year". On 10 May 2017, the club was awarded the title of "Non-League Team of the Season" by bookmaker Coral. The club held its first annual AGM in July 2017, at which the existing board of directors was voted to remain in place for a period of three years. The existing board of directors consisting of Paul Manning and Peter Furmedge had been augmented during the season by Peter Manning as club secretary and Gary Johansen as media director. At the AGM, Cathy Long was also voted onto the board. Subsequently, a member's council was formed and voted Sarah Comber as its chairman, with initially Francis Stanton and latterly Andrew Lavin elected as secretary. Upon her election, Comber took up an automatic place on the board of directors as chair of the member's council.

Season 2017–18: Another cup win and first FA Cup journey
The 2017–18 started with another trophy, beating Atherton Collieries 4–3 on penalties after a 3–3 draw in 90 minutes, in the annual Champions Cup game between the Premier Division Champions and Challenge Cup winners. On 5 August, the club travelled away to fellow Premier Division side Padiham for its first-ever game in the FA Cup, which City of Liverpool won. In the second preliminary round, they played Northern Premier League side Prescot Cables. After a 2–2 draw at Prescot in the first match, a new record home crowd attendance of 956 witnessed the club set the highest scoring game of the round as they defeated their opponents 8–2 to secure their place in the first qualifying round, and a home tie against Nantwich Town. On 1 September, the first FA Cup run came to an end with a deflected 95th-minute winner handing Nantwich Town a 2–1 victory in front of a record crowd of 1,022.

In the FA Vase, the club progressed to the 3rd round before being beaten by Stockton Town of the Northern League, who themselves went all the way to the final at Wembley Stadium. Season 2017–18 concluded with a creditable 4th place finish in the Hallmark Security league Premier Division. In June 2018, Comber resigned her position as chair of the member's council and was subsequently replaced by Paul McGrady, who was co-opted onto the main board of directors on an interim basis pending a full meeting of the supporter's council; however, following a nomination process, no other member was nominated for the role and McGrady was elected unopposed. In July 2018, the club announced that it had parted ways with manager Simon Burton by mutual consent after two years in charge. Two days later, the club announced that it had appointed veteran centre-half Craig Robinson as manager.

Season 2018–19: Another title win 
On 14 July, the club travelled to Merthyr Town of the Southern League to play for the prestigious Supporter's Direct Shield, losing 3–1 in what was new manager Craig Robinson's first full game in charge. After an excellent debut season, Robinson led the team to its first title success, winning the North West Counties Football League Premier Division with 91 points. At various points of the season, the title seemed to be a formality, but with rivals (and landlords) Bootle FC going on an unprecedented 20-game winning run in the league, culminating in a 1–0 victory over COLFC in front of a record crowd of 1,344, the team were relegated into 2nd place in the table with just 1 game to play (having been in 1st place since 27 September 2018).

A 2–0 away victory at Irlam on the last day of the season, as Bootle drew 1–1 at home with Northwich Victoria, saw the lead change hands again and City of Liverpool crowned champions. In the FA Cup, the team reached the 2nd qualifying round before losing to Chester FC of the Conference North in front of the club's record crowd of 1,834. In the FA Vase, a disappointing 0–4 away loss at Hebburn Town in front of yet another record crowd, this time 1,304, ended the club's hopes in the 1st round.

Having beaten Avro FC 6–2 on aggregate in the Macron Cup Semi Finals, City of Liverpool FC met 1874 Northwich in the final on 4 May at Altrincham FC, with the club looking to become only the 4th team in NWCFL history to win the Double and separately to become also one of four teams to have won the Challenge Cup twice; however, in a dour affair, 1874 scored an 88th-minute winner. At the NWCFL AGM on 15 June, Robinson was named as Premier Division Manager of the Year. On the same day, the club was officially accepted into the Northern Premier League for the 2019–20 season.

Season 2019–20: Null and void 
The club's inaugural season in the Northern Premier League was largely disappointing as the club adapted to life in Step 4 of the National League Pyramid. At the club's annual AGM, Sean Lindblad had been appointed to a place on the board of directors for "Community" and Mike Caulfield appointed as "Club Welfare Office" having been co-opted during the previous season. The NPL North West Division was considered particularly difficult as due to a re-alignment in the FA's ongoing re-structure; the makeup of the division was to include teams from the North East, making average travelling distances much greater.

In the pre-season, the club once again won the NWCFL Champions Cup, inflicting revenge on 1874 Northwich with a 2–1 home win. This trophy was the club's sixth in its three seasons in the NWCFL and equalled the trophy haul of Warrington Town and thus making the club the joint most successful club in NWCFL history based on trophies won, although the six wins came in only three seasons, whereas Warrington's came in twelve seasons. In the FA Cup, wins over Campion FC and Skelmersdale Utd set up a first qualifying round game away at Warrington Town FC. The game saw a crowd of over 600 enjoy a 2–2 draw, with City of Liverpool leading 2-1 due to two strikes from Jack Hazlehurst into injury time, before intense pressure from the hosts got them a very late equaliser and sent the tie to a replay the following Tuesday. In front of a record home crowd of 1099, the match was a disaster and ended 0–4 to the Yellows, with the opening goal coming in the first minute after defender Danny Dalton suffered a season-ending achilles tendon injury.

Both the FA trophy and NPL League Cup campaigns ended in first round defeats to Tadcaster Albion and Mossley respectively. The club fared better in the Liverpool Senior Cup with a 5–1 home win (its first ever home tie in the LSC) over divisional rivals Widnes and a 2–0 win over Everton U23's securing a home semi-final draw with Landlords Bootle. In the league, a seven-match unbeaten run saw the club head the form table early in the season, but a series of heavy defeats to Ramsbottom, Tadcaster and Marine were soon to follow as the club hovered around lower mid table. A notable 3–0 win at home over Prescot Cables was a highlight in what was largely a dour and uninspired campaign as the squad struggled to find its feet at the level. A discrepancy in a loan signing subsequently saw the club deducted six points in February, just before the entire season was scrapped due to the COVID-19 outbreak and subsequently declared null and void.

Season 2020–21: Curtailed 
Season 2020–21 started off very brightly with a 0–3 away win at Glossop North End in the FA Cup preliminary round, but quickly turned bad with successive home defeats to Marske in the league (2-4) and Morpeth in the FA Cup 2nd Preliminary round (0-3), before two further defeats away from home at Kendal Town (0-1) and Workington (2-5) brought about the end of Robinson's reign as manager of the club, with the club sitting bottom of the league with no points. The club installed Michael Ellison (formerly of Runcorn Linnets) and despite him taking over too late for any training sessions to be undertaken, the team put on an outstanding performance to win away at Brighouse Town 5–2. Still with no training sessions, the team turned in an excellent performance to draw 2–2 with Prescot Cables (away) on the following Tuesday.

Trafford at home came next and the excellent start under Ellison's tutelage continued with a hard-fought 1–0 home win to make it 7 points gained from 3 matches. Due to the COVID-19 pandemic, only three more league games were able to be played which saw a depleted squad lose away at title contenders Colne and a 2-1 Boxing Day home derby defeat to Marine, interspersed by a 4–1 home win against Pontefract Collieries and a creditable 10th position as the season was officially curtailed by the FA. The club had an excellent run in the FA Trophy, beating Atherton Collieries (NPL Prem) 3–0 away before repeating the feat and going away to beat Buxton also of the NPL Premier Division 2-1 and losing 0–2 in a highly creditable performance away at National League North side Darlington.

At the club's AGM, both Cathy Long and Gary Walthew stood down as directors. Earl Jenkins was elected unopposed.

Season 2021–22: Stability 
The season was one of mid-table stability with club's lowest position being 15th and highest being 8th, with a final league position a creditable 9th. This was the club's first fully completed season in the NPL.

The season was affected by a spate of season ending injuries to key players; Kelly, Burke, Potter, Johnston, Sharrock and serious shorter term injuries to various other key players, culminating in the club signing 55 players throughout the season which was by far a divisional high.

The club achieved its highest ever FA cup run, reaching the 3rd qualifying round before going out to eventual NPL Premier Division title winners Buxton, but beating Vanarama National League North side Farsley Celtic 3-0 in a huge early cup upset.

The clubs 1 season playing at Vauxhall Motors ended and The Purps are now back at Bootle FC’s Berry Street Garage Stadium for the 2022/23 season and beyond.

Season 2022-23: Early Season Shock & New Manager 
After the difficult pre-season of 2021/22 with several games postponed due to weather and COVID and the actual troubled season at Ellesmere Port, the club went into Michael Ellison's 2nd full season full of confidence.

A solid pre-season saw wins over FCUM and Chorley and a creditable performance at Marine, although a hugely disappointing loss at 7th Step AFC Knowsley was a precursor to a shockingly bad start to the league season.

A defeat at Glossop on Matchday 1 set the tone, which was swiftly followed by a 2-1 home reverse v Skelmersdale Utd. A 0-0 away draw at Ramsbottom was followed a highly entertaining 4-3 win in the replay, but sadly the team could not follow up and lost the next 2 league games, at home to Macclesfield (0-1) and 1-2 away at Bootle. This left the club rooted at the bottom of the table with 0 points from 4 league games and the 2nd half in particular against Bootle gave a feeling of capitulation and brought about the end of Michael Ellison's time as 1st team Manager and he was relieved of his duties later that same day.

The search began for a new manager and just over a week later (including a 3-0 away defeat at Dunston in the FA Cup, under the auspices of players Glenn Rule and Nathan Burke) Paul McNally took over as 1st team manager, leaving Skelmersdale Utd in the process.

During this transition process the club lost away at Colne and 1874 Northwich in the league and went out of the FA Trophy on penalties to Sheffield FC, before finally securing its first points of the season with a 3-2 away win at Hanley Town and followed that up with another 3-2 win, this time at home to Trafford FC. New signing Kevin Ellison had lifted the spirits of everyone at the club and made several assists and scored what proved to be the winning goal at Hanley. 

Although 43, Kevin is in great shape and had spent season 2021/22 at Newport County in League Two, playing in the Play-Off Final at Wembley

Stadium 
City of Liverpool originally intended to play within Liverpool itself from the start, but suitable facilities did not exist at the time the club was formed, so they were forced to explore other venues. In December 2015, the club agreed a deal with Bootle that saw them ground-share at the TDP Solicitors Stadium in neighbouring Sefton for the 2016–17 and 2017–18 seasons while they continued to search for a permanent home within the city.

In February 2018, the club was granted a period of exclusivity on a site in Fazakerley by Liverpool City Council, the owners of the site. The site at Fazakerley Playing Fields was in a state of disrepair, but the club believed that it could build a 3,000-seat community stadium on the site  As part of the stadium announcement, the club also announced that they had signed a further 3-year ground-share agreement with Bootle FC. that can take them to the end of the 2020–21 season.

In March 2021, an announcement from the club informed the supporters that the ground-share agreement with Bootle had expired and the club had entered into a two-year ground-share agreement with Vauxhall Motors F.C. and would play games at vanEupen Arena in Ellesmere Port, Cheshire.

In June 2021, the club informed members that it is in the pre-planning process with Liverpool City Council to construct a ground in Fazakerley.

In March 2022, the club announced that they will play their home games for the 2022/23 season at Bootle, ending their two-year ground-share agreement with Vauxhall Motors a year early.

Squad

Honours
North West Counties Football League Premier League Winners:
 Winners (1): 2018-19
North West Counties Football League First Division Challenge Cup Winners:
 Winners (1): 2016-17
North West Counties Football League League Challenge Cup Winners:
 Winners (1): 2016-17
  North West Counties Football League First Division Play-Off Winners
 Winners (1): 2016-17
  North West Counties Football League Champions Cup
 Winners (1): 2017–18, 2019–20

Ownership
The club was officially registered as a community benefit society in November 2015 and is owned completely by its supporters. Membership is obtained by paying an annual fee to the club (£10 for adults, £5 for concessions, and £1 for children) and entitles the owner to a single share. Members aged 16 and over also receive voting rights within the club.

Memberships had reached the 500 mark by February 2016, despite the club being without a manager or players and having not contested a single match at that point. As of May 2017, the club had 1,414 official paid up members.
Club memberships are available anytime to anyone who wants to be part of the community owned club.

Records
Source:
Best FA Cup Performance: Third qualifying round, 2021/22 
Best FA Vase Performance: Third round, 2017–18 
Best FA Trophy Performance: 2nd Round, 2020–21
Record home win: 8–0 vs Atherton Laburnum Rovers, 29 August 2016, NWCFL Division One
Record away win: 0–10 vs Stockport Town, 31 December 2016, NWCFL Division One
Record home attendance: 1,099 vs Warrington Town, 1 September 2019, FA Cup First qualifying round

References

External links
 Official club Website

Football clubs in England
North West Counties Football League clubs
Fan-owned football clubs in England
Association football clubs established in 2015
2015 establishments in England
Football clubs in Merseyside